The  is a commuter electric multiple unit (EMU) train type operated by the private railway operator Hanshin Electric Railway in Japan since 1996.

Design
The 9000 series was designed and built by Kawasaki Heavy Industries following the January 1995 Great Hanshin earthquake, to replace vehicles damaged by the earthquake. The 9000 series uses a stainless steel design for its body work.

Operations
The 9000 series are able to operate in multiple with the newer 1000 series.

Formation
, five six-car sets (numbered 9201 to 9209) are in service, formed as shown below, with car 1 at the Umeda end. Four cars are powered.

Cars 3 and 4 each have one lozenge-style pantograph.

Interior
Passenger accommodation consists of longitudinal bench seating throughout.

History

References

External links

 Hanshin Electric Railway train information 

Electric multiple units of Japan
9000 series
Train-related introductions in 1996
1500 V DC multiple units of Japan
Kawasaki multiple units